William Bourchier, 1st Count of Eu (2 March 137528 May 1420), was an English knight created by King Henry V 1st Count of Eu, in Normandy.

Origins

He was born 2 March 1375, the son of Sir William Bourchier (d. 1375; the younger son of Robert Bourchier, 1st Baron Bourchier (d. 1349), of Halstead, Essex, Lord Chancellor) by his wife Eleanor de Louvain (27 March 1345 – 5 October 1397), daughter and heiress of Sir John de Louvain (d. 1347) (alias Lovayne etc.), feudal baron of Little Easton in Essex. The arms of Louvain were: Gules billety or a fess of the last, often shown with varying number of billets and on occasion with a fess argent, for example in stained glass at Hengrave Hall, Suffolk: Gules, a fess argent, between fourteen billets or.  

Eleanor was descended from Godfrey de Louvain (d. 1226), feudal baron of Little Easton, son of Godfrey III, Count of Louvain (1142–1190), by his 2nd marriage, and half-brother of Henry I, Duke of Brabant (1165–1235). His inheritance from his mother's Louvain lands included the Suffolk manors of Bildeston, Hopton, Shelland and "Lovaynes" in Drinkstone, and (in Essex), Little Easton, Broxted and Aythorpe Roding.

Career
He fought at the Battle of Agincourt in 1415.
In 1417 he was in the retinue of King Henry V during his second expedition to France, and played a significant role in the capture of Normandy. 
In 1419, he was appointed Captain of Dieppe and was granted powers to receive the submission of the town and Comté of Eu. The French count of Eu had refused to pay homage to the conquering English king and thus had been held prisoner in England since Agincourt. 

In June 1419, King Henry V awarded six captured French comtés to certain of his more significant English supporters, and the Comté of Eu was granted to William Bourchier, thus making him 1st Count of Eu.

Marriage and children

He married Anne of Gloucester, Countess of Stafford, the daughter of the Plantagenet prince, Thomas of Woodstock, 1st Duke of Gloucester (1355–1397) (youngest son of King Edward III) by his wife Eleanor de Bohun elder daughter and coheiress of Humphrey de Bohun, 7th Earl of Hereford (1341–1373), Earl of Essex and Northampton. The Wrey baronets who were the heirs of the Bourchier Earls of Bath quartered the arms of Wrey with those of Bourchier, the Royal Arms of England and Bohun. They had the following children:
Henry Bourchier, 1st Earl of Essex (1404 – 4 April 1483), eldest son
William Bourchier, (25 October 1415 – 1474), jure uxoris 9th Baron FitzWarin, 2nd son.
John Bourchier, 1st Baron Berners (c. 1416 – 16 May 1474), 3rd son
Thomas Bourchier, (c. 1418 – 30 March 1486), Archbishop of Canterbury and a cardinal, 4th son
Eleanor Bourchier, (c. 1417 – November, 1474), wife of John de Mowbray, 3rd Duke of Norfolk

Death and burial
He died at Troyes, France on 28 May 1420  and was buried at Llanthony Secunda Priory, Gloucester.

Ancestry

Sources
 Woodger, L.S., biography of Sir William Bourchier, published in The History of Parliament: House of Commons 1386-1421, ed. J.S. Roskell, L. Clark, C. Rawcliffe, 1993

External links
Bourchier Family

References

Bourchier, William, Count of Eu
Bourchier, William, Count of Eu
Bourchier, William, Count of Eu
Bourchier, William, Count of Eu
Norman warriors
William, Count of Eu
Burials at Llanthony Secunda Priory, Gloucester
15th-century English people
15th-century French people
Medieval French military personnel
English knights